Lincoln Avenue is a street of the north side of city of Chicago. It runs from Clark Street (itself a diagonal) on the western border of Lincoln Park largely to the northwest, ending in Morton Grove, Illinois. It leaves the city limits of Chicago at Devon Avenue, through the village of Lincolnwood, curves through the village of Skokie and ends at Dempster Street in Morton Grove. Between Foster Avenue and Skokie Boulevard U.S. Route 41 runs on Lincoln Avenue.

Most of Lincoln Avenue is zoned commercial, and is lined by shops, restaurants and other establishments. It is the site of the yearly Taste of Lincoln Avenue, held between Fullerton Avenue and Wrightwood Avenue. It is also the site of the Maifest and German American Fest in Lincoln Square.

History
Originally it was a Native American trail running along a slight ridge in the usually soggy ground of pre-settlement Chicago. Prior to the assassination of Abraham Lincoln, the street was known as Little Fort Road, and it led to the town of Little Fort, now known as Waukegan, Illinois. In Morton Grove it was known as Miller's Mill Road.

Major intersections

See also 
 Biograph Theater
 Davis Theater 
 Krause Music Store
 Old Town School of Folk Music
 Pueblito Viejo

References

Streets in Chicago
U.S. Route 41